Ships named Kaiser Wilhelm II include:

 , a predreadnought battleship built by the German Navy; in service 1900-1922
 , a passenger steamer for North German Lloyd, 1889–1908; named SS Hohenzollern from 1900
 , a 1902 passenger steamer for North German Lloyd; seized by the United States in 1917; became troop transport USS Agamemnon (ID-3004); scrapped in 1940

See also

 , formerly Konig Wilhelm II

Ship names